The VSX 7000 is a videoconferencing system made by Polycom.

The Polycom VSX 7000 was introduced in October 2003. The system features CD quality audio, TV-quality video, and an integrated MCU unit capable of mixed-network multipoint capability for up to four sites.

The camera is connected to the Polycom VSX 7000 via a S-Video cable.

The VSX 7000 was intended for medium-sized conference rooms, and generally received positive reviews.

The system was superseded by the Polycom VSX7000s in 2005. Support from Polycom for this system ended at 12/31/2010.

References 

Teleconferencing
Videotelephony